Woodcrest Baptist Academy (WBA) is a fundamentalist Christian K-12 school located in Fridley, Minnesota, founded in 1973 by members of Woodcrest Baptist Church. WBA is a member of the American Association of Christian Schools(AACS) and the Minnesota Association of Christian Schools(MACS).

History
It was started by members of Woodcrest Baptist Church in fall of 1973, and run by head pastor, Dr. Clarke Poorman. After he retired, his son Pastor Mark Poorman, took over the responsibilities as superintendent of the school, and pastor of the church. The younger Poorman has been involved with the school in some capacity since 1985. WBA started with 30 students and used the Accelerated Christian Education (ACE) curriculum. When enrollment reached over 100 students the educational curriculum was changed to A Beka books put out my Pensacola Christian College in Pensacola, Florida. Later the mathematics curriculum was changed to Saxon math for grades 5th-12th.

Facilities
Located at 6875 University Ave NE Fridley, MN 55432 WBA shares its building with Woodcrest Baptist Church. In 1976 the administration decided to add on an educational wing that included 13 classrooms that were added to the church building. A 10,000 square foot building that contained offices, gymnasium, locker rooms, concession area, and a classroom was built in 1986.

Mission
Per the organisation: Woodcrest Baptist Academy, a ministry of Woodcrest Baptist Church, exists to help parents raise their children to live effectively in God’s World, and to prepare students academically, physically, socially, and spiritually for service to God and country.

Programs
The average class size is 20 students. In high school and junior high two grades have class together (ex. 9th grade with 10th grade and 11th grade with 12th grade), this allows the small number of faculty members to teach all of the content and grade levels more effectively. For subjects such as math that are based on cumulative knowledge each grade is taught individually.

Students are required to take major content areas taught in high school including math, science, English, fine arts, physical education, and history as well as Bible class.

Testing
Every spring the entire school takes the Stanford Achievement Test Series so that the school’s performance can be measured against the national standards of testing. The school consistently scores above the national standards on these tests in all subject areas.

Dress code
There is a strict dress code that is observed by all students, faculty, family members, and anyone who comes to a school affiliated event.

Athletics
WBA has soccer (varsity and junior varsity), basketball, and baseball teams for high school boys. For girls they offer basketball and volleyball (varsity and junior varsity). They play other Christian schools in the area that are of similar size.

References

External links
http://www.woodcrestbaptistacademy.org/
http://www.woodcrestbaptistchurch.org/  
http://www.woodcrestbaptistacademy.org/images/pdf/handbook.pdf  
http://www.privateschoolreview.com/school_ov/school_id/15332

Private schools in Minnesota
Schools in Anoka County, Minnesota
Educational institutions established in 1973
1973 establishments in Minnesota